Nusach can refer to:

 Nusach (Jewish custom)
 Nusach (Jewish music)